Alexandru Grigore (born 8 September 1986) is a Romanian rugby union football player. He plays as a lock for professional SuperLiga club Steaua București.

Career
Alexandru Grigore played most of his career for Steaua București and has been part of the team since 2005.

Honours
Steaua București
 SuperLiga: 2005/06
 Romanian Cup: 2007, 2013

References

External links

1986 births
Living people
People from Pitești
Romanian rugby union players
CSA Steaua București (rugby union) players
București Wolves players
Rugby union locks